Michigan's 6th Senate district is one of 38 districts in the Michigan Senate. It has been represented by Democrat Mary Cavanagh since 2023, succeeding fellow Democrat Erika Geiss.

Geography
District 6 encompasses parts of Oakland and Wayne counties.

2011 Apportionment Plan
District 6, as dictated by the 2011 Apportionment Plan, covered much of Downriver to the southwest of Detroit in Wayne County, including the suburban communities of Westland, Taylor, Romulus, Rockwood, Flat Rock, Huron, Sumpter, Van Buren, Belleville, and most of Brownstown.

The district was split between Michigan's 12th and 13th congressional districts, and with the 11th, 12th, 16th, 17th, 21st, and 23rd districts of the Michigan House of Representatives.

Recent election results

2018

2014

Federal and statewide results in District 6

Historical district boundaries

References 

6
Wayne County, Michigan